There are 69 towns in Slovenia. According to the Local Self-Government Act of the Republic of Slovenia, a town is a larger urban settlement with more than 3,000 residents and differing from other settlements in its size, economical structure, population, population density and historical development. A settlement acquires the status of town through a decision of the Government of Slovenia. Until 2005, the decision was made by the National Assembly of Slovenia.

List of all towns in Slovenia
Figures are based on the statistics from the Statistical Office of the Republic of Slovenia.

References

External links

 
Slovenia
Slovenia
 Cities and towns
Slovenia